Iris Kadrić (born 16 September 1994) is a footballer who plays as a forward. Born in Sweden, she has played four times for the Bosnia and Herzegovina women's national football team.

Personal life
Kadrić was born in Borås, Sweden. Her parents were born in Sarajevo (then part of the Socialist Federal Republic of Yugoslavia, now Bosnia and Herzegovina), but moved to Sweden in 1992 due to the Bosnian War. As Kadrić has dual nationality, she was eligible to play for either Sweden or Bosnia and Herzegovina.

Career

Club career
Aged 15, Kadrić signed for Falköpings KIK U17. She later played for the senior team. In 2011, Kadrić made 19 appearances for Falköpings KIK in the Swedish Division 1, scoring four goals. Kadrić also played for Swedish teams IK Frisco and Herrljunga. In the 2013–14 season, Kadrić played for Bosnia and Herzegovina Women's Premier League team SFK 2000, with whom she made three appearances in the 2013–14 UEFA Women's Champions League. For the 2015 season, she joined Swedish Division 1 team . In June 2015, she injured herself whilst on international duty, and was out for an extended period of time.

International career
Kadrić played for Sweden U17 before deciding to switch her allegiance to Bosnia and Herzegovina to play for their U19 team. At the time she stated that she would still like to play for the Swedish senior team in the future. She played for Bosnia and Herzegovina U19 in the 2012 UEFA Women's U-19 Championship First qualifying round, scoring twice in a match against Moldova U19, and the 2013 UEFA Women's U-19 Championship First qualifying round, where she scored against Czech Republic U19. She was first called up to the Bosnia and Herzegovina women's national football team in July 2013. She made four appearances for the national team in the qualification event for the 2015 FIFA Women's World Cup, in matches against Scotland, Sweden, Northern Ireland, and the Faroe Islands.

References

External links

Profile at Swedish Football Association 

Bosnia and Herzegovina women's footballers
1994 births
Living people
Women's association football forwards
People from Borås
Swedish women's footballers
Swedish expatriate sportspeople in Bosnia and Herzegovina
Sportspeople from Västra Götaland County
Sweden women's youth international footballers